Fedyuninskaya is a rural locality (a village) in Yenangskoye Rural Settlement, Kichmengsko-Gorodetsky District, Vologda Oblast, Russia. The population was 43 as of 2002.

Geography 
Fedyuninskaya is located 60 km northeast of Kichmengsky Gorodok (the district's administrative centre) by road. Podgorodye is the nearest rural locality.

References 

Rural localities in Kichmengsko-Gorodetsky District